Jean-Claude Darouy (30 August 1944 – 8 August 2006) was a French rower who competed in the 1964 Summer Olympics.

In 1964 he was the coxswain of the French boat which won the silver medal in the coxed pairs event. He also coxed the French boat in the coxed four competition when they finished fourth.

External links
Jean-Claude Darouy's profile at Sports Reference.com

French male rowers
Coxswains (rowing)
Olympic rowers of France
Rowers at the 1964 Summer Olympics
Olympic silver medalists for France
1944 births
2006 deaths
Olympic medalists in rowing
Medalists at the 1964 Summer Olympics
20th-century French people